Matt Farley (born June 3, 1978) is an American filmmaker, musician, and songwriter who has released over 23,000 songs . His music is released under a variety of band names.

Biography
Farley grew up in Massachusetts, graduated from Bishop Fenwick High School in 1996, and then majored in English at Providence College in Rhode Island, graduating in 2000. Around 2008, he discovered that songs with silly titles from his band "Moes Haven" (which he had streaming on Spotify) were the only ones generating revenue. He soon began writing and recording songs about everything and anything that he thought people might search for. His band names, which exceed 70, often correlate to the subject matter of their songs. For example, "Papa Razzi and the Photogs" release albums filled with songs about celebrities, and "The Hungry Food Band" releases songs about food. Thousands of songs celebrate birthdays with different names. Over 500 songs are "prom proposals" songs each sung with a different name. Yet another series of albums are composed completely of songs about towns within a U.S. state or other country, with lyrics derived from reading Wikipedia articles on each town. However, his most lucrative band is likely the "Toilet Bowl Cleaners", who sing songs about fecal matter.  According to Farley, one song that contains only the word "poop" repeated over and over generates $500 in streaming revenue every month  likely in part because children request it from Alexa or other devices. Farley earned over $23,000 in 2013 from his song catalog and $65,000 per year by 2018.

Farley has also written custom songs, generating $2,000 or more in revenue per month, but stopped doing this in 2021. The Reply All podcast has featured Farley multiple times and used his custom songs.

Much of Farley's output is piano-and-vocals compositions. Albums can run to 100 songs in length. Some of his albums, even from a band such as The Toilet Bowl Cleaners, contain more serious output; that band's 11th album is titled Mature Love Songs, none of which are about fecal matter. Farley's serious and non-lucrative albums are called "no jokes" albums. He previously had a day-job at a group home for teens but by 2017 his musical career was so lucrative that he was able to focus on it full-time. He has two children with his wife Elizabeth.

In 2016, Farley performed "Used to Be a Pizza Hut", a song topic derived from internet traffic about how re-purposed locations of the American chain restaurant still retain their distinctive roof style, on The Tonight Show Starring Jimmy Fallon.

Discography

"No Jokes" work 
Farley calls his serious music "No Jokes" music. It started with Moes Haven from 2004 to 2010, and was then revived in 2014 with Projection from the Side's Basement Reunion. This is a list of all of his "No Jokes" material.

 Moes Haven – Out with the Old (2004)
 Moes Haven – Music for the Final Millennium (2004; taken down)
 Moes Haven – Dislocated Songs (2004)
 Moes Haven – Svetlana Finds Solace in the Arms of English Men of Letters (2005)
 Moes Haven – If Not Us, Who? (2005; taken down)
 Moes Haven – Someone Else. (2005)
 Moes Haven – Explorations in Madness (2005)
 Moes Haven – Moe's Haven (2005)
 Moes Haven – Sir Paul Made Ram. We Made This. (2005)
 Moes Haven – Down With Memories (2005)
 Moes Haven – January (2006)
 Moes Haven – February: From the Barnyard to the Bayou and Back (2006)
 Moes Haven – March: of the Aliens (2006)
 Moes Haven – April: What a Cruel Month! (2006)
 Moes Haven – May: I Buy You a Sandwich? (2006)
 Moes Haven – June (2006)
 Moes Haven – July: in the Sun with Me? (2006)
 Moes Haven – August: of Temporal Inconsistency (2006)
 Moes Haven – September: in Manchvegas (2006)
 Moes Haven – (SH)OC(K)TOBER (2006)
 Moes Haven – November the Tar! (2006)
 Moes Haven – December (2006)
 Moes Haven – If Not Us, Who? (2007; re-release with altered tracklist)
 Moes Haven – This is My Millennium! (2008; re-release with altered tracklist)
 Moes Haven – Stromboli's Alarm Clock (2010)
 Moes Haven – Songs from the Vault, Vol. 1 (2013)
 The Toilet Bowl Cleaners – Mature Love Songs (2014)
 Projection from the Side – Basement Reunion (2014)
 Matt Motern Manly Man – Joyous Cackle! (2015)
 The Very Nice Interesting Singer Man – Common Phrases (2015)
 Matt Motern Manly Man – Motern Heartburn (2016)
 The Very Nice Interesting Singer Man – Keep Being Awesome! (2016)
 The Guy Who Sings Songs About Cities and Towns – I've Never Left My Hometown (2016)
 The Strange Man Who Sings About Dead Animals – Animal Noises (2016)
 Matt Motern Manly Man – Delicate Genius / Thirsty Killer (2017)
 The Finklestinks – Double Take Action (2017)
 The Very Nice Interesting Singer Man – Roy and Cathy (2017)
 Projection from the Side – Let's Go Camping! (2017)
 The Very Nice Interesting Singer Man – Emotions (2017)
 Matt Motern Manly Man – Great Unfinished Masterpiece (2017)
 The Big Heist – MO75, Volume 1 (2018)
 The Big Heist – MO75, Volume 2 (2018)
 The Big Heist – MO75, Volume 3 (2018)
 Matt Motern Manly Man – I Forgot What I Was Gonna Say (2019)
 Brennan McFarley – Wednesday Night Chronicles (2019)
 Caniko Tucci – These Are the Forces (2019)
 The Big Heist – Tightrope (2020)
 Brennan McFarley – The Beyond (2020)
 Caniko Tucci – Frantic Frenzy (2020)
 The Finklestinks – Sweetheart Deal (2021) 
Moes Haven – Metal Detector Maniac (2021)

Music label and films

Farley's output is released under the label Motern Media, and he is rarely identified directly by name. Farley often includes his personal phone number in his lyrics, which yields calls and texts from fans surprised to find the number is real.

Farley has made several low-budget comedy-horror films, primarily starring his family and friends, with titles such as Freaky Farley (2007), Don't Let the Riverbeast Get You (2012), and Slingshot Cops (2016). He is the subject of a 2018 Australian documentary, Lessons from a Middle Class Artist.

His film work has been chronicled in the interview book Motern on Motern: Conversations with Matt Farley and Charles Roxburgh by Will Sloan and Justin Decloux.

He performs an annual five-and-a-half-hour concert "extravaganza" in Danvers, Massachusetts.

References

External links
 
 

1978 births
Living people
Songwriters from Massachusetts
People from Danvers, Massachusetts
Providence College alumni
Bishop Fenwick High School (Peabody, Massachusetts) alumni
21st-century American musicians